Lindrick was an ancient district of England.  The majority of the district appears to have lain in what is now South Yorkshire, but the village of Carlton-in-Lindrick is in Nottinghamshire.

The name of the district is derived from the Old English for "raised, straight strip marked by lime trees".

Lindrick seems to have reached as far as Lindrick Dale, Laughton Lindrick wood, which lay next to Roche Abbey, and the Lindrick area of Tickhill.

References

History of Nottinghamshire
History of South Yorkshire
Ancient subdivisions of Yorkshire